Klara Kashapova (born 29 January 1970) is a Russian long-distance runner. She competed in the women's 10,000 metres at the 1996 Summer Olympics.

References

External links
 

1970 births
Living people
Place of birth missing (living people)
Russian female long-distance runners
Russian female cross country runners
Olympic female long-distance runners
Olympic athletes of Russia
Athletes (track and field) at the 1996 Summer Olympics
Goodwill Games medalists in athletics
Competitors at the 1994 Goodwill Games
World Athletics Championships athletes for Russia
Russian Athletics Championships winners